Kilbarron is a civil parish and a townland in the historical  barony of Ormond Lower, County Tipperary in Ireland. It is located west of Borrisokane.

The woods at Kilbarron form a part of Borrisokane Forest which consists of several widely dispersed small areas of woodland managed by Coillte, the state sponsored forestry company.

The Dáil constituency of Offaly incorporates twenty four electoral divisions from Tipperary North including Kilbarron.

See also
 List of civil parishes of County Tipperary

References

Townlands of County Tipperary
Civil parishes of Ormond Lower